Avalon Park may refer to some communities in the United States and Israel:

Avalon Park, Alabama, in Jefferson County, Alabama
Avalon Park, Florida
Avalon Park, Chicago, Illinois, a neighborhood
Avalon Park, Missouri
Avalon Park, Bahad 1, Mavet La Rasar

 Avalon Park is also the name of a resort and spa complex in Miskolc, Hungary.